Quaid-e-Azam Public School, Karachi is a not-for-profit boarding school located in Karachi, Pakistan. The school is run by the Sindh Madressah Board and is spread over 200-acre land.

It was founded in 1987 by Pakistani educationist Nisar Hassanally Effendi. The school provides education to poor boys and girls.

References

Schools in Karachi
1987 establishments in Pakistan
Boarding schools in Pakistan
Memorials to Muhammad Ali Jinnah